Peggy Preheim (born 1963) is an American artist.

Early life and education
Preheim was born in Yankton, South Dakota and was educated at the Minneapolis College of Art and Design from 1981 to 1983.

Collections
Preheim's work is included in the collections of the Museum of Modern Art New York, the Denver Art Museum and the Whitney Museum of American Art.

References

American women artists
American artists
1963 births
Living people
Minneapolis College of Art and Design alumni
People from Yankton, South Dakota
21st-century American women